The 2017 American Ethanol E15 250 presented by Enogen was the 14th stock car race of the 2017 NASCAR Xfinity Series season and the seventh iteration of the event. The race was held on Sunday, June 24, 2017, Newton, Iowa, at Iowa Speedway, a 0.875 miles (1.408 km) permanent oval-shaped racetrack. The race took the scheduled 250 laps to complete. At race's end, William Byron, driving for JR Motorsports, would win the race after leading 78 laps. It was Byron's first career win in the xfinity series. To fill out the podium, Ryan Sieg of RSS Racing and Tyler Reddick of Chip Ganassi Racing would finish second and third, respectively.

Background 

It has over 25,000 permanent seats as well as a unique multi-tiered RV viewing area along the backstretch.

Entry list 

 (R) denotes rookie driver.
 (i) denotes driver who is ineligible for series driver points.

Practice

First practice 
The first practice session was held on Friday, July 23, at 1:00 PM CST. The session would last for 55 minutes.

Final practice 
The final practice session was held on Friday, June 23, at 4:00 PM EST. The session would last for 55 minutes.

Qualifying 
Qualifying was held on Saturday, June 24, at 5:15 PM EST. Since Iowa Speedway is under  in length, the qualifying system was a multi-car system that included three rounds. The first round was 15 minutes, where every driver would be able to set a lap within the 15 minutes. Then, the second round would consist of the fastest 24 cars in Round 1, and drivers would have 10 minutes to set a lap. Round 3 consisted of the fastest 12 drivers from Round 2, and the drivers would have 5 minutes to set a time. Whoever was fastest in Round 3 would win the pole.

No drivers would fail to qualify.

Full qualifying results

Race results 
Stage 1 Laps: 60

Stage 2 Laps: 60

Stage 3 Laps: 130

Standings after the race 

Drivers' Championship standings

Note: Only the first 12 positions are included for the driver standings.

References 

2017 NASCAR Xfinity Series
NASCAR races at Iowa Speedway
June 2017 sports events in the United States
2017 in sports in Iowa